Khyber Medical College (abbreviated as KMC) was established in 1954, is a public sector medical college located in Peshawar. Khyber Medical College is the oldest medical college of the province, Khyber Pakhtunkhwa and is considered as one of the most prestigious medical colleges of Pakistan.
	
The entire process of admissions to all the public sector medical and dental colleges of the province and FATA is managed by the Directorate of Admission in Khyber Medical College. Beside undergraduate medical education, the college offers teaching and research facilities to the postgraduate students, i.e., M. Phil, in all basic Medical Sciences, FCPS in Clinical as well as basic medical sciences, and minor diplomas in many specialties It is one of the several medical schools affiliated with Khyber Medical University and is recognized by PMDC.

History
Khyber Medical College, which is situated at the doorstep of university of Peshawar, occupies in the site of ancient Buddhist academy. In 1954, the foundation stone of Khyber Medical College, as faculty of Medicine, of Peshawar University, was laid by the then Governor General of Pakistan, Mr. Ghulam Muhammad. The College started functioning in 1955 with enrollment of fifty students with meager facilities. It remained under the administrative control of health department after parting way from Peshawar University in 1975. Presently, the college and hospital has been given administrative and financial autonomy by the Government of Khyber Pakhtunkhwa and is working under the institutional management committee, headed by Chief Executive.

Admissions
Khyber Medical College enrolls 287 students yearly.

Departments

Basic Sciences
 Anatomy
 Physiology
 Biochemistry
 Pharmacology 
 Pathology 
 Forensic Medicine 
 Community Medicine
 Medical Education

Clinical Sciences
 Medicine
 Surgery
 Gynaecology/Obstetrics
 Paediatrics
 Ophthalmology
 ENT
 Radiology
 Anesthesia
 Paediatric Surgery
 Plastic Surgery
 Nephrology
 Orthopedics
 Cardiology
 Pulmonology
 Skin
 Psychiatry
 Nuclear Medicne

Library
Khyber Medical College library was established in September 1955 and has a total of 35,300/- volumes of current Medical books and more than 8,000 bound volumes of journals.

Library is split into three portions, i.e. a lending part for students, a reference part for teachers and a part containing periodicals.

Accommodations
Khyber Medical College has separate hostels for boys & girls in the premises of Peshawar University campus. For boys there are three hostels:
 Qasim Hall
 Razi Hall
 Cenna Hall

Attached hospitals
 Khyber Teaching Hospital
 IRNUM

Notable alumni
 Shakil Afridi, helped the CIA confirm the location of Osama bin Laden
 Sania Nishtar - cardiologist, author
 Muhammad Hafizullah - professor of cardiology, vice chancellor of KMU
 Sayed Amjad Hussain -  cardiothoracic surgeon, inventor of pleuroperitoneal shunt and a special endotracheal tube
 A. K. Jamil - anaesthetist, inventor of a non-kink catheter mount used in anaesthesia
 Seema Zia - politician, member of Pakistan Provincial Assembly of Sindh
 Said Alam - pediatric surgeon and political activist
 Zulfiqar Bhutta - Senior Scientist
 Nasim Ashraf

See also 
 Khyber Teaching Hospital
 Khyber Medical University
 Ayub Medical College
 List of medical schools in Pakistan

References 

Universities and colleges in Peshawar District
Medical colleges in Khyber Pakhtunkhwa
1954 establishments in Pakistan
Educational institutions established in 1954
Universities and colleges in Peshawar
Public universities and colleges in Khyber Pakhtunkhwa
Khyber Medical College alumni